Bertha of Burgundy (964 – 16 January 1010) was Queen of the Franks as the second wife of King Robert II.

Bertha was the daughter of King Conrad of Burgundy and his wife Matilda, daughter of King Louis IV of France and Gerberga of Saxony. She was named for her father's mother, Bertha of Swabia. She first married Count Odo I of Blois in about 983. They had several children, including Theobald II and Odo II.

After the death of her husband in 996, Bertha's second cousin Robert, the eldest son of King Hugh Capet of France, wished to marry her. He had recently repudiated his first wife, Susanna, who was many years his senior. The union was opposed by King Hugh, who feared that political problems could be caused by religious authorities due to their consanguinity. The marriage nevertheless went ahead around the time of Hugh's death in October 996, which left Robert as sole king. Pope Gregory V and his successor Pope Sylvester II pronounced anathemas against Robert for his "incestuous" marriage and the pair were forced to separate, but Robert several times attempted to rejoin her.

References

10th-century births
11th-century deaths
People excommunicated by the Catholic Church
House of Capet
Elder House of Welf
French queens consort
Countesses of Chartres
Year of birth unknown
Year of death unknown 
10th-century French people
10th-century French women 
11th-century French people
11th-century French women
Daughters of kings
Remarried royal consorts